Adetus similis is a species of beetle in the family Cerambycidae. It was described by Bruch in 1939.

References

Adetus
Beetles described in 1939